Eugene G. d'Aquili (1940-1998) was a research psychiatrist who specialized in studying members of religious communities (e.g., brain image scans).

Works
Why God Won't Go Away: Brain Science and the Biology of Belief (2001) with Andrew Newberg (Author) and Vince Rause, Ballantine Books
The Mystical Mind: Probing the Biology of Religious Experience (1999) with Andrew B. Newberg, Fortress Press
Brain, Symbol and Experience: Toward a Neurophenomenology of Human Consciousness (1990) with Charles D. Laughlin and John McManus, New Science Library
The Spectrum of Ritual: A Biogenetic Structural Analysis (1979) with Charles D. Laughlin and John McManus, Columbia University Press
Biogenetic Structuralism (1974) with Charles D. Laughlin, Columbia University Press
The Biopsychological Determinants of Culture (1972) Addison-Wesley

External links
Obituary at: https://www.independent.co.uk/arts-entertainment/obituary-eugene-daquili-1174695.html

1940 births
1998 deaths
20th-century American physicians
American neuroscientists
American psychiatrists
Mysticism scholars
Psychologists of religion